Bromsulfthalein (also known as bromsulphthalein, bromosulfophthalein, and BSP) is a phthalein dye used in liver function tests. Determining the rate of removal of the dye from the blood stream gives a measure of liver function.

References

Triarylmethane dyes
Phthalides
Bromoarenes
Phenols
Benzenesulfonates
Organic sodium salts